Belmont South is a suburb of the City of Lake Macquarie in New South Wales, Australia, located  southwest of Newcastle's central business district on the eastern side of Lake Macquarie.

References

External links
 History of Belmont South (Lake Macquarie City Library)

Suburbs of Lake Macquarie